Schaalsee is a  lake in Germany. It forms part of the border between Schleswig-Holstein (district Herzogtum Lauenburg) and Mecklenburg-Vorpommern (districts Ludwigslust-Parchim and Nordwestmecklenburg). The town of Zarrentin is located on its southern shores. Other municipalities on the lake are Seedorf, Sterley, Salem, Kittlitz and Kneese.

It was declared a biosphere reserve in 2000 (309 km2).

External links
 Schaalsee-Elbe Biosphere Reserve
 
Agroforstprojekt am Schaalsee

Biosphere reserves of Germany
Lakes of Schleswig-Holstein
Nature reserves in Schleswig-Holstein
LSchaalsee